The 1976 Nicholls State Colonels football team represented Nicholls State University as a member of the Gulf South Conference (GSC) during the 1976 NCAA Division II football season. Led by third-year head coach Bill Clements, the Colonels compiled an overall record of 4–6–1 with a mark of 2–5–1 in conference play, tying for seventh place in the GSC. Nicholls State played home games at John L. Guidry Stadium in Thibodaux, Louisiana.

Schedule

References

Nicholls State
Nicholls Colonels football seasons
Nicholls State Colonels football